Annett State Forest is a  state forest of New Hampshire located in the town of Rindge in Cheshire County and extending north into Sharon in Hillsborough County. It includes Annett Wayside Park and Hubbard Pond, which offers canoe access.

Annett Wayside Park at 538 Cathedral Road features picnic facilities and a  hiking trail to Black Reservoir.

References

New Hampshire state forests
Parks in Cheshire County, New Hampshire
Parks in Hillsborough County, New Hampshire
Rindge, New Hampshire